Compana may refer to:
 an American barley cultivar
 Santa Compaña, a deep-rooted mythical belief in rural Galicia and Asturias, Spain